To be ridiculous is to be highly incongruous or inferior. 

Ridiculous may also refer to:

 Ridiculous (album), an album by the British New Wave group Squeeze
 Ridiculous (album), a 2006 comedy album by Norm Macdonald
 "Ridiculous" (DJ Drama song), 2009
 "Ridiculous" (Haley Georgia song), 2015
 "Ridiculous", a song by P.O.D. from Satellite
 Theatre of the Ridiculous, a theatrical genre
 Ridiculous speed, before ludicrous speed and after light speed in Spaceballs
 Fort Ridiculous, Long Point, Cape Cod, Massachusetts, USA; an American Civil War fort

See also

 Ridiculousness (disambiguation)
 Ridicule (disambiguation)